William James Harris, 6th Earl of Malmesbury TD (18 November 1907 – 11 November 2000), styled Viscount FitzHarris until 1950, was a British peer.

The son of James Harris, 5th Earl of Malmesbury, Harris was educated at Eton and Trinity College, Cambridge and, as a surveyor, joined and served in the Royal Hampshire Regiment. After leaving the army, he served in a variety of positions, all of which involved forestry, agriculture, or surveying work. He succeeded his father in the earldom in 1950. In 1973 he became Lord Lieutenant of Hampshire, a position he held until 1982. From 1966 to 1974 he was Official Verderer of the New Forest.

The family seat was Greywell Hill House, near Farnham in Hampshire.

Lord Malmesbury married firstly, the Honourable Diana Carleton (1912–1990), daughter of Dudley Carleton, 2nd Baron Dorchester, on 7 July 1932. They had three children:, 
Lady Sylvia Veronica Anthea Harris (b. 17 May 1934), married John Maltby, son of Air Vice Marshal Sir Paul Copeland Maltby, and had issue.
Lady Nell Carleton Harris (b. 3 July 1937), married Captain Michael Boyle, descendant of Henry Boyle, 5th Earl of Shannon and William Edmund Cradock-Hartopp, 3rd Baronet, High Sheriff of Warwickshire, and had issue.
James Harris, 7th Earl of Malmesbury (b. 19 June 1946), married Sally Ann Rycroft, daughter of Sir Richard Newton Rycroft, 7th Baronet, and had issue.

He married secondly, Margaret Campbell-Preston (d. 1994) in 1991 and thirdly, Bridget Hawkings on 5 July 1996.

References

External links

1907 births
2000 deaths
Alumni of Trinity College, Cambridge
Royal Hampshire Regiment officers
Deputy Lieutenants of Hampshire
6
English people of Dutch descent
English surveyors
Lord-Lieutenants of Hampshire
People educated at Eton College
Schuyler family

Malmesbury